The Benin International is an international badminton tournament held in Benin. The event is part of the Badminton World Federation's Future Series and part of the Badminton Confederation of Africa's Circuit.

Host cities
 2017–2019, 2021: Cotonou 
 2022: Ouidah

Past winners

Performances by nation

References

Badminton tournaments in Benin
2017 establishments